The Last Barricade is a 1938 British drama film directed by Alex Bryce and starring Frank Fox, Greta Gynt and Meinhart Maur. It was produced by the British subsidiary of 20th Century Fox at the company's Wembley Studios in London for release as a Quota Quickie. The film's sets were designed by the art director Carmen Dillon.

Cast
 Frank Fox as Michael Donovan
 Greta Gynt as Maria
 Paul Sheridan as 	Valdez
 Meinhart Maur as Don Jose
 Dino Galvani as 	Lopez
 Vernon Harris as Captain Lee
 Hay Petrie as Captain MacTavish
 Andreas Malandrinos as General

References

Bibliography
 Chibnall, Steve. Quota Quickies: The Birth of the British 'B' Film. British Film Institute, 2007.
 Low, Rachael. Filmmaking in 1930s Britain. George Allen & Unwin, 1985.
 Wood, Linda. British Films, 1927-1939. British Film Institute, 1986.

External links

1938 films
Films directed by Alex Bryce
Quota quickies
Films shot at Wembley Studios
Films set in Spain
20th Century Fox films
British drama films
British black-and-white films
1938 drama films
1930s English-language films
1930s British films